The Frank R. Jelleff Co., or more commonly Jelleff's was a Washington, D.C.-based retailer that specialized in women's apparel.

History

Jelleff's was founded March 1910, on F Street, N.W. in downtown Washington, D.C.  Its founder, Frank R. Jelleff, founded the first Boy's Club in the D.C. area, and the club at  3265 S Street NW, just off Wisconsin Ave., is named in his honor.  The company was family run until 1968, when a group headed by I. Lee Potter purchased the store from the founder's widow.  Potter served as chairman until the company's closing in 1979.  His father, Alan Potter, served as president.

Flagship store
The flagship store was located at 1214–1220 F Street, NW, in the "F Street Mall."  The store closed in early 1973.

Branch stores

Jelleff's opened its first suburban location at the Shirlington Shopping Center in nearby suburban Virginia in December 1947.  That location closed November 1, 1972, but the  store reopened in 1973, as a discount general department store. It also operated locations in Silver Spring; in Falls Church; at Springfield Mall; a  store at Tysons Corner Center; and at 4472 Connecticut Ave., NW, in Washington, D.C. It operated a  store, known as the "Little Shop," from 1942 to 1969, at 6936 Wisconsin Ave., in Bethesda, Maryland. A  store opened in the then-new Crystal Underground in September 1976, and in 1979, at the time of the chain's closing, continued to operate independently as "Fifteen Thirty Five." The Tysons Corner store closed in early 1979, followed in May by the Connecticut Avenue and Springfield Mall locations, then in June by Silver Spring.

References

Defunct retail companies of the United States
Defunct companies based in Washington, D.C.
American companies established in 1910
Retail companies disestablished in 1979
1910 establishments in Washington, D.C.
1979 disestablishments in Washington, D.C.
Retail companies established in 1910